Enrique "Kike" Maíllo Iznájar (born 3 June 1975) is a Spanish film director and screenwriter. He is best known for Eva, which won him the 2011 Goya Award for Best New Director.

Biography
From 1994 Maíllo studies at the Escola Superior de Cinema i Audiovisuals de Catalunya (ESCAC). His degree project was the short film Las cabras de Freud, with Tristán Ulloa in the lead role. Since 2000 he teaches screenwriting and directing the ESCAC.

Filmography 
Feature films
 Eva (2011)
 Toro (2016)
 A Perfect Enemy (2020)

References

External links
 

1975 births
Living people
People from Barcelona
Spanish film directors
Spanish screenwriters
Spanish male writers
Male screenwriters